The Shands Bridge is a two-lane automobile bridge carrying SR 16 over the St. Johns River south of Jacksonville, Florida.

History
The first structure at the site was a 2-mile-long wooden toll span with a draw bridge inaugurated in 1928. It was located just north of the current span, crossing from Orangedale to the present Shands pier on the west side of the river. The current bridge was dedicated on October 30, 1963, and features concrete beam-type construction for a total of two lanes. Until the building of the I-295 Buckman Bridge it was the only crossing of the St. Johns River between Jacksonville and Palatka.

On October 7, 2016, the eastern approach to the bridge was eroded by Hurricane Matthew, so the bridge was closed to traffic for an indefinite time period. On October 9, the bridge reopened.

In 2004, proposals were made to replace or upgrade the span. Problems cited include increasing traffic in the Clay County and St. Johns County areas, safety, and the inability of large boats to travel upriver. One plan proposed a new bridge north of the existing one, connecting to extensions of SR 9B and SR 23. Eventually a planned span just to the south was selected. In the fall of 2005, the railings of the bridge were upgraded to solid concrete barriers in an effort to reduce over-bridge fatalities.

First Coast Expressway Replacement
The third and final segment of the First Coast Expressway (also known as SR 23, which will connect I-10 and I-95 as a partial outer beltway around Jacksonville and Orange Park) includes a new four-lane bridge over the St. Johns River just south of where the Shands Bridge currently stands, as well as construction of new roadway connecting to I-95 in St. Johns County. Right-of-way acquisition, design and permitting for this $763 million segment is expected to be completed in 2020, with construction beginning in 2023 and ending in 2030. The current bridge will be partially or fully removed. The vertical clearance height of the new bridge will be 65 feet from the water line, compared to the existing 45 feet of clearance. The additional 20 feet will match the clearance of the Buckman Bridge to the north and Palatka's Memorial Bridge to the south and is an improvement for marine commerce in the region.

Gallery

See also
 
 
 
 List of crossings of the St. Johns River

References

External links

St. Johns River Crossing Corridor Study
Nautical Chart

Bridges completed in 1929
Bridges completed in 1963
Bridges over the St. Johns River
1929 establishments in Florida
Steel bridges in the United States
Girder bridges in the United States
Road bridges in Florida
Transportation in Clay County, Florida
Transportation in St. Johns County, Florida